Michael Shafer (born January 7, 1972) is an American college basketball coach, most recently the women's head coach at the University of Richmond.

Career
Shafer played at the College of William & Mary, where he walked on to the team.  He was on the coaching staff at the University of Georgia from 1996 to 2005 before becoming head coach of the Spiders.

He holds the record for the number of wins by a women's basketball coach at the University of Richmond.

It was announced on March 10, 2019, that Shafer's contract would not be renewed.

Head coaching record

References

External links
Richmond bio

1972 births
Living people
American men's basketball players
American women's basketball coaches
Basketball coaches from Georgia (U.S. state)
Basketball players from Georgia (U.S. state)
Georgia Lady Bulldogs basketball coaches
Sportspeople from Athens, Georgia
Richmond Spiders women's basketball coaches
William & Mary Tribe men's basketball players
Guards (basketball)